The 2012 FIVB Volleyball World League was the 23rd edition of the annual men's international volleyball tournament, played by 16 countries from 18 May to 8 July 2012. The Final Round was held in Sofia, Bulgaria.

Qualification

Top 13 teams of the 2011 edition and  directly qualified.
 and  qualified through the qualification.

Pools composition
The pools were announced on 17 December 2011.

Squads

Pool standing procedure
 Match points
 Number of matches won
 Sets ratio
 Points ratio
 Result of the last match between the tied teams

Match won 3–0 or 3–1: 3 match points for the winner, 0 match points for the loser
Match won 3–2: 2 match points for the winner, 1 match point for the loser

Intercontinental round
All times are local.
The Final Round hosts Bulgaria, the winners of each pool and the best second place team among all pools will qualify for the Final Round. If Bulgaria are ranked first in Pool D, the two best second place teams of all pools will qualify for the Final Round.
The schedule was confirmed on 10 February 2012.

Pool A

|}

Week 1
Venue:  Hamamatsu Arena, Hamamatsu, Japan

|}

Week 2
Venue:  Palacio del Voleibol, Santo Domingo, Dominican Republic

|}

Week 3
Venue:  Yantarny Sports Complex, Kaliningrad, Russia

|}

Week 4
Venue:  SPC Vojvodina, Novi Sad, Serbia

|}

Pool B

|}

Week 1
Venue:  Ricoh Coliseum, Toronto, Ontario, Canada

|}

Week 2
Venue:  Spodek, Katowice, Poland

|}

Week 3
Venue:  Ginásio Adib Moyses Dib, São Bernardo do Campo, Brazil

|}

Week 4
Venue:  Tampere Ice Stadium, Tampere, Finland

|}

Pool C

|}

Week 1
Venue:  Nelson Mandela Forum, Florence, Italy

|}

Week 2
Venue:  Palais des Sports de Gerland, Lyon, France

|}

Week 3
Venue:  Yeomju Gymnasium, Gwangju, South Korea

|}

Week 4
Venue:  Dallas Convention Center Arena, Dallas, United States

|}

Pool D

|}

Week 1
Venue:  Fraport Arena, Frankfurt, Germany

|}

Week 2
Venue:  Polideportivo Almirante Brown, Burzaco, Argentina

|}

Week 3
Venue:  Pavilhão Multiusos, Guimarães, Portugal

|}

Week 4
Venue:  Arena Armeec, Sofia, Bulgaria

|}

Final round
Venue:  Armeets Arena, Sofia, Bulgaria
All times are Eastern European Summer Time (UTC+03:00).

Pool play

Pool E

|}

|}

Pool F

|}

|}

Final four

Semifinals

|}

3rd place match

|}

Final

|}

Final standing

Awards

Most Valuable Player
  Bartosz Kurek
Best Scorer
  Todor Aleksiev
Best Spiker
  Zbigniew Bartman
Best Blocker
  Marcin Możdżonek

Best Server
  Clayton Stanley
Best Setter
  Georgi Bratoev
Best Receiver
  Todor Aleksiev
Best Libero
  Krzysztof Ignaczak

References

External links
Official website
Final Standing

2012
FIVB World League
International sports competitions in Toronto